The Pinacoteca Nazionale is a national museum in Siena, Tuscany, Italy. Inaugurated in 1932, it houses especially late medieval and Renaissance paintings from Italian artists. It is housed in the Brigidi and Buonsignori palaces in the city's center: the former, built in the 14th century, it is traditionally identified as the Pannocchieschi family's residence. The Palazzo Bichi-Buonsignori, although built in the 15th century, has a 19th-century neo-medieval façade based on the city's Palazzo Pubblico.

The gallery has one of the largest collections of Sienese paintings with gold backgrounds from the 14th and 15th centuries.

Works in the gallery include:
Duccio di Buoninsegna's Polyptych N. 28 and Madonna of the Franciscans
Guido da Siena's St. Peter Enthroned
Simone Martini's Blessed Agostino Novello and His Miracles (c. 1330)
Ambrogio Lorenzetti's Annunciation (c. 1344)
Bartolo di Fredi's Adoration of the Magi
Michelino da Besozzo's Mystical Marriage of Saint Catherine (c. 1420)
Il Sodoma's Christ at the Column and Deposition
Domenico Beccafumi's Birth of the Virgin, St. Michael Expelling the Rebel Angels, Coronation of the Virgin, Trinity Triptych, Marriage of St Catherine, Stigmatization of St. Catherine of Siena, St Lucy and Christ in Limbo

Other artists represented include Ugolino di Nerio, Pietro Lorenzetti, Sassetta, Domenico di Bartolo, Taddeo di Bartolo, Francesco di Giorgio Martini, Matteo di Giovanni, Neroccio di Bartolomeo

Gallery

See also
 List of national galleries

References

Sources

External links 
 Official website of the Museum.
 Pinacoteca Nazionale di Siena - Scalarchives.com
 Pinacoteca Nazionale di Siena - Scolarsresource.com

 
Art museums and galleries in Tuscany
National museums of Italy
Art museums established in 1932
Museums in Siena
1932 establishments in Italy
Art museums and galleries in Siena